Vanessa Van Basten is an Italian duo with various guests and contributors from the alternative and extreme Italian underground scene. They make slow, heavy, metaphysical instrumental music. Their influences are cosmic psychedelia, industrial rock (like Swans or Godflesh), Neurot & Hydrahead catalogue, old 4AD bands, krautrock, Norwegian black metal. They are currently on Robotic Empire records.

Members
 Morgan Bellini – guitars, synth, sampler, sequencer, mic, software, fx, harmonica, glockenspiel, percussions (2002–present)

Former members
 Stefano Parodi: bass, synth
 Roberto Dellarocca: live drums 
 NANT: Korg MS20, live drones

Discography
Vanessa Van Basten EP (2005)
La Stanza di Swedenborg (2007)
Psygnosis EP (2008)
Closer to the Small/Dark/Door (2012)
Disintegration EP (2015)

References

Italian heavy metal musical groups
Post-metal musical groups
Italian musical duos